Ailurarctos ("cat bear")  is an extinct genus of panda from the Late Miocene of China, some 8 million years ago.

Different teeth structures in the Ailuropoda lineage indicate a mosaic evolution during the past 2 million years. Like modern giant pandas, Ailurarctos had a false thumb that allowed it to grip bamboo, suggesting that the panda's specialized bamboo diet goes back to as early as 6 to 7 million years ago.

References 

Miocene mammals of Asia
Fossil taxa described in 1989
Miocene bears
Prehistoric carnivoran genera